NGC 2800, also known as PGC 26302, is an elliptical galaxy in the constellation Ursa Major. It was discovered February 17, 1831 by William Herschel.

References

External links 
 

Discoveries by William Herschel
Astronomical objects discovered in 1831
2800
26302
Ursa Major (constellation)
Elliptical galaxies